Stöð 2 Extra was an Icelandic TV channel.

Stöð 2 Extra was owned by 365 ljósvakamiðlar, a company which was a part of 365, the defunct biggest media corporation in Iceland.

See also 
 SkjárEinn

Television channels in Iceland
Television channels and stations established in 2005
Television channels and stations disestablished in 2013
Companies based in Reykjavík